The 2016 UNLV Rebels football team represented the University of Nevada, Las Vegas during the 2016 NCAA Division I FBS football season. The Rebels were led by second-year head coach Tony Sanchez and played their home games at Sam Boyd Stadium. They were members of the West Division of the Mountain West Conference. They finished the season 4–8 and 3–5 in Mountain West play to finish in a three-way tie for third place in the West Division.

Schedule

Schedule Source: 2016 UNLV Rebels Football Schedule

Game summaries

Jackson State

 Passing leaders: JSU – LaMontiez Ivy, 14–34, 134 yards, 1 touchdown, 1 interception and UNLV – Johnny Stanton, 10–12, 217 yards, 3 touchdowns
 Rushing leaders: JSU – Joshua Bates, 8 carries, 32 yards and UNLV – Charles Williams, 12 carries, 96 yards, 1 touchdown
 Receiving leaders: JSU – Carle Ollie, 2 receptions, 39 yards, 1 touchdown and UNLV – Devonte Boyd, 4 receptions, 135 yards, 3 touchdowns
 Tackling leaders: JSU – Javancy Jones, 5 tackles and UNLV – Tau Lotulelei, 6 tackles

at UCLA

 Passing leaders: UCLA – Josh Rosen, 23–38, 267 yards, 1 touchdown and UNLV – Johnny Stanton, 11–28, 153 yards, 1 touchdown, 2 interceptions
 Rushing leaders: UCLA – Soso Jamabo, 11 carries, 90 yards, 3 touchdowns and UNLV – Lexington Thomas, 19 carries, 112 yards, 1 touchdown
 Receiving leaders: UCLA – Jordan Lasley, 3 receptions, 55 yards and UNLV – Devonte Boyd, 5 receptions, 84 yards
 Tackling leaders: UCLA – Eli Ankou, 8 tackles and UNLV – Ryan McAleenan, 14 tackles

at Central Michigan

 Passing leaders: CMU – Cooper Rush, 20–33, 352 yards, 6 touchdowns and UNLV – Johnny Stanton, 15–41, 131 yards, 1 touchdown, 2 interceptions
 Rushing leaders: CMU – Jonathan Ward, 12 carries, 51 yards and UNLV – Lexington Thomas, 17 carries, 113 yards, 1 touchdown
 Receiving leaders: CMU – Corey Willis, 6 receptions, 108 yards, 2 touchdowns and UNLV – Mehki Stevenson, 5 receptions, 48 yards
 Tackling leaders: CMU – Malik Fountain, 9 tackles and UNLV – Troy Hawthorne, 10 tackles

Idaho

 Passing leaders: IDAHO – Matt Linehan, 17–35, 249 yards, 1 touchdown and UNLV – Johnny Stanton, 14–26, 175 yards, 1 touchdown, 2 interceptions
 Rushing leaders: IDAHO – Aaron Duckworth, 20 carries, 90 yards, 1 touchdown and UNLV – Lexington Thomas, 19 carries, 160 yards, 2 touchdowns
 Receiving leaders: IDAHO – Callen Hightower, 4 receptions, 67 yards, 1 touchdown and UNLV – Devonte Boyd, 6 receptions, 64 yards
 Tackling leaders: IDAHO – Ed Hall, 15 tackles and UNLV – Tau Lotulelei, 15 tackles

Fresno State

 Passing leaders: FS – Virgil Chason, 16–45, 296 yards, 2 touchdowns, 1 interception and UNLV – Dalton Sneed, 8–16, 129 yards, 1 touchdown
 Rushing leaders: FS – Dontel James, 18 carries, 53 yards and UNLV – Charles Williams, 18 carries, 153 yards, 1 touchdown
 Receiving leaders: FS – Aaron Peck, 5 receptions, 194 yards, 2 touchdowns and UNLV – Devonte Boyd, 3 receptions, 46 yards
 Tackling leaders: FS – Jeff Camilli, 10 tackles and UNLV – Tau Lotulelei, 10 tackles

at San Diego State

 Passing leaders: SDSU – Christian Chapman, 15–20, 215 yards, 1 touchdown and UNLV – Dalton Sneed, 2–12, 9 yards, 1 interception
 Rushing leaders: SDSU – Donnel Pumphrey, 31 carries, 141 yards, 1 touchdown and UNLV – Dalton Sneed, 12 carries, 56 yards
 Receiving leaders: SDSU – Mikah Holder, 3 receptions, 68 yards and UNLV – Devonte Boyd, 2 receptions, 9 yards
 Tackling leaders: SDSU – Damontae Kazee, 5 tackles and UNLV – Troy Hawthorne, 16 tackles

at Hawaii

 Passing leaders: UH – Dru Brown, 17–32, 217 yards, 2 touchdowns and UNLV – Dalton Sneed, 19–27, 279 yards, 2 touchdowns
 Rushing leaders: UH – Paul Harris, 7 carries, 94 yards, 1 touchdown and UNLV – Lexington Thomas, 21 carries, 102 yards, 1 touchdown
 Receiving leaders: UH – Marcus Kemp, 6 receptions, 126 yards and UNLV – Devonte Boyd, 6 receptions, 83 yards, 1 touchdown
 Tackling leaders: UH – Jahlani Tavai, 14 tackles and UNLV – Troy Hawthorne, 10 tackles

Colorado State

 Passing leaders: CSU – Nick Stevens, 21–28, 237 yards, 2 touchdowns and UNLV – Dalton Sneed, 7–23, 185 yards, 2 touchdowns, 1 interception
 Rushing leaders: CSU – Marvin Kinsey Jr., 10 carries, 68 yards, 2 touchdowns and UNLV – Dalton Sneed, 15 carries, 96 yards
 Receiving leaders: CSU – Michael Gallup, 7 receptions, 91 yards, 1 touchdown and UNLV – Devonte Boyd, 3 receptions, 62 yards
 Tackling leaders: CSU – Kevin Davis, 7 tackles and UNLV – Troy Hawthorne, 12 tackles

at San Jose State

 Passing leaders: SJSU – Kenny Potter, 24–39, 292 yards, 2 touchdowns and UNLV – Kurt Palandech, 10–21, 161 yards, 1 touchdown, 1 interception
 Rushing leaders: SJSU – Zamore Zigler, 18 carries, 77 yards and UNLV – Charles Williams, 22 carries, 141 yards, 1 touchdown
 Receiving leaders: SJSU – Tim Crawley, 8 receptions, 114 yards and UNLV – Devonte Boyd, 6 receptions, 136 yards
 Tackling leaders: SJSU – Christian Tago, 14 tackles and UNLV – Tau Lotulelei, 12 tackles

Wyoming

 Passing leaders: UNLV – Kurt Palandech, 20–32, 252 yards, 3 touchdowns and WYO – Josh Allen, 14–31, 334 yards, 4 touchdowns, 2 interceptions
 Rushing leaders: UNLV – Kurt Palandech, 16 carries, 157 yards, 1 touchdown and WYO – Brian Hill, 23 carries, 119 yards, 3 touchdowns
 Receiving leaders: UNLV – Devonte Boyd, 10 receptions, 127 yards and WYO – Tanner Gentry, 5 receptions, 184 yards, 3 touchdowns
 Tackling leaders: UNLV – Tau Lotulelei, 12 tackles and WYO – Lucas Wacha, 16 tackles

at Boise State

 Passing leaders: BSU – Brett Rypien, 10–20, 109 yards and UNLV – Kurt Palandech, 10–20, 113 yards, 1 touchdown
 Rushing leaders: BSU – Jeremy McNichols, 31 carries, 206 yards, 4 touchdowns and UNLV – Kurt Palandech, 9 carries, 64 yards, 2 touchdowns
 Receiving leaders: BSU – Thomas Sperbeck, 5 receptions, 47 yards and UNLV – Andrew Price, 3 receptions, 65 yards, 1 touchdown
 Tackling leaders: BSU – Darren Lee, 11 tackles and UNLV – Tau Lotulelei, 11 tackles

Nevada

 Passing leaders: NEV – Ty Gangi, 15–22, 193 yards, 1 touchdown and UNLV – Kurt Palandech, 9–22, 270 yards, 1 interception
 Rushing leaders: NEV – James Butler, 32 carries, 196 yards, 3 touchdowns and UNLV – Kurt Palandech, 14 carries, 98 yards, 1 touchdown
 Receiving leaders: NEV – Wyatt Demps, 2 receptions, 57 yards and UNLV – Trevor Kanteman, 2 receptions, 39 yards
 Tackling leaders: NEV – Gabriel Sewell, 8 tackles and UNLV – Troy Hawthorne, 15 tackles

References

UNLV
UNLV Rebels football seasons
UNLV Rebels football